Kentucky Route 2055 (KY 2055) is a  state highway in the U.S. State of Kentucky. Its southern terminus is at KY 1020 in Louisville and its northern terminus is at KY 907 in Louisville.

Major junctions

Gallery

References

2055
2055
Transportation in Louisville, Kentucky